Floyd E. "Bill" Lear was an American football and basketball coach.  Lear was the head football coach at Alma College  in Alma, Michigan.  He held that position for the 1944 and 1945 seasons. His coaching record at Alma was 1 wins and 12 losses.

References

Year of birth missing
Year of death missing
Alma Scots football coaches
Alma Scots men's basketball coaches